The Serbia women's national basketball team represents Serbia in international women's basketball competition and is controlled by the Basketball Federation of Serbia. Serbia is currently the European Champions, and are ranked tenth in the FIBA World Rankings.

It was known as the "FR Yugoslavia / Serbia and Montenegro women's national basketball team" until 2006. When Serbia became independent, it became the successor state to the Serbia and Montenegro and, therefore, the results of previous state and SFR Yugoslavia rightfully belong to it.

For the women's national team that played under the flag of Socialist Federal Republic of Yugoslavia see Yugoslavia women's national basketball team.

Competitions
For the results before 1992, see Yugoslavia women's national basketball team.

Name of the nation during the tournaments:
 FR Yugoslavia / Serbia and Montenegro 1992–2006
 Serbia 2007–present

Olympic Games

FIBA World Cup

EuroBasket

Mediterranean Games

Team

Current roster
Roster for the 2022 FIBA Women's Basketball World Cup.

Head coaches
Since 1992, the national team was managed by a total of eight different head coaches. Miodrag Vesković (3) and Marina Maljković are the only coaches with more than one spell.

Serbia and Montenegro

Serbia

Notable players
 FIBA EuroBasket MVP
 Ana Dabović – 2015
 Sonja Vasić – 2021
 FIBA EuroBasket All-Tournament Team
 Ana Dabović – 2015
 Sonja Vasić – 2015, 2019, 2021
 WNBA champion
 Ana Dabović – 2015
 EuroLeague Top Scorer
 Mila Nikolić – 2000
 Ana Joković – 2003
 Gordana Grubin – 2004

See also
Basketball Federation of Serbia
Serbia men's national basketball team
Yugoslavia women's national basketball team

References

External links

FIBA profile

 
Women's national basketball teams